Elmhurst, California may refer to:
Elmhurst, Oakland, California
Elmhurst, Sacramento, California